Margaliot is a moshav in northern Israel. Located along the border with Lebanon in the Upper Galilee, near the town of Kiryat Shmona, it falls under the jurisdiction of Mevo'ot HaHermon Regional Council.

Name
The moshav was named after agronomist , a principal director of the Jewish Colonization Association who was appointed by Baron Edmond de Rothschild to supervise the work of Jewish colonies in Galilee in the early twentieth century.

History
A settlement existed at the site in the Iron Age I (1200-1000 BCE), and again from the Persian period (586-332 BCE) until the latter part of the Byzantine period (5th-6th centuries CE).

The Crusader castle of Chastel Neuf (in medieval French) or Castellum Novum (in Latin), lit. "New Castle", was built around  1106-1107 immediately north of the current moshav. Refortified by Mamluk sultan Baibars in 1266, the castle was completely rebuilt in the 18th century by Zahir al-Umar, who ruled the Galilee in the 18th century (1730s–1775).
Remains of the castle, covering an area of 9 dunams, include a rock-hewn Crusader moat, cisterns, and a vaulted gatehouse and other wall remains from the 18th century.

The moshav was built in part on the grounds of the former Shiite Arab Palestinian village of Hunin, established in the 18th century and depopulated during the 1948 war.

Margaliot was established in 1951, by Jewish immigrants from Yemen and Iraq, on the site of the depopulated Arab village.

During the 2006 Lebanon War, 230 residents of Margaliot were evacuated to the Neve Hadassah youth village near Netanya due to Katyusha rocket fire from Lebanon.

Notable residents
Yossi Sarid (1940–2015), politician and news commentator

References

Iraqi-Jewish culture in Israel
Moshavim
District of Safad
Populated places in Northern District (Israel)
Geography of Israel
Geography of Lebanon
Israel–Lebanon border
Yemeni-Jewish culture in Israel
Populated places established in 1951
1951 establishments in Israel
Crusader castles